What mad pursuit may refer to:
 What Mad Pursuit: A Personal View of Scientific Discovery, a 1988 autobiography of Francis Crick 
 The first question on the ninth line of Keats' poem Ode on a Grecian Urn
 What Mad Pursuit, a 2013 documentary by Rob Nilsson
 What Mad Pursuit, a 1934 book by Martha Gellhorn
 "What Mad Pursuit", a short story by Noël Coward